Yotam Assaf Ottolenghi (born 14 December 1968) is an Israeli-born British chef, restaurateur, and food writer. He is the co-owner of seven delis and restaurants in London and the author of several bestselling cookery books, including Ottolenghi: The Cookbook (2008), Plenty (2010), Jerusalem (2012) and Simple (2018).

Biography
Yotam Ottolenghi was born to Jewish parents in Jerusalem and raised in Ramat Denya, Jerusalem, the son of Michael Ottolenghi, a chemistry professor at Hebrew University, and Ruth Ottolenghi, a high school principal. He is of Italian Jewish and German Jewish descent, and often spent his childhood summers in Italy. He has an older sister, Tirza Florentin. His younger brother, Yiftach, was killed by friendly fire in 1992 during his  military service. Ottolenghi is an Italian name, an Italianised form of Ettlingen, a town in Baden-Württemberg from which Jews were expelled in the 15th and 16th centuries; many settled in Northern Italy.

Ottolenghi was conscripted into the Israel Defence Forces in 1989, serving three years in IDF intelligence headquarters. He then studied at the Adi Lautman Interdisciplinary Programme for Outstanding Students of Tel Aviv University, where in 1997, he completed a combined bachelor's and master's degree in comparative literature; his thesis being on the philosophy of the photographic image. While working on his thesis, Ottolenghi served as a night copy editor for Haaretz. In 1997, Ottolenghi and his then partner Noam Bar moved to Amsterdam, where he edited the Hebrew section of the Dutch-Jewish weekly NIW. He later relocated to London to study French pastry cooking at Le Cordon Bleu.

Ottolenghi met his partner Karl Allen in 2000; they married in 2012 and live in Camden, London, with their two sons, born in 2013 and 2015. In 2013, Ottolenghi "came out as a gay father" in a Guardian essay that detailed the lengthy process of conceiving their first son via gestational surrogacy, an option that he believes should be more widely available to those who cannot conceive naturally.

Culinary career
Ottolenghi served as a pastry chef at three London restaurants: the Michelin-starred Capital Restaurant, Kensington Place, and Launceston Place in Kensington New Town. In 1999, he became head pastry chef at the artisanal pastry shop Baker and Spice, where he met the Palestinian chef Sami Tamimi, who grew up in Jerusalem's Old City. Ottolenghi and Tamimi bonded over a shared language—Hebrew—and a joint "incomprehension of traditional English food".

In 2002, the duo (in collaboration with Noam Bar) founded the eponymous delicatessen Ottolenghi in the Notting Hill district of London. The deli quickly gained a cult following due to its inventive dishes, characterised by the foregrounding of vegetables, unorthodox flavour combinations, and the abundance of Middle Eastern ingredients such as rose water, za'atar, and pomegranate molasses. When asked to explain his cooking philosophy, Ottolenghi said, "I want drama in the mouth." The Ottolenghi brand has since expanded to three more delis (in Islington, Marylebone and Chelsea), a formal restaurant in Spitalfields, a brasserie named NOPI in Soho, and a vegetable-centric restaurant named ROVI which opened in Fitzrovia in June 2018.

In 2006, Ottolenghi began writing a weekly column for The Guardian titled "The New Vegetarian," though he himself is not a vegetarian and has sometimes noted where a vegetable-centric recipe would pair well with a particular cut of meat. Influenced by the straightforward, culturally-grounded food writing of Nigella Lawson and Claudia Roden, Ottolenghi's recipes rarely fit within traditional dietary or cultural categories. He explained that his mission is to "celebrat[e] vegetables or pulses without making them taste like meat, or as complements to meat, but to be what they are. It does no favour to vegetarians, making vegetables second best."

His debut cookery book Ottolenghi: The Cookbook was published in 2008. Eight volumes have followed: the all-vegetable cookery books Plenty (2010), Plenty More (2014) and Ottolenghi Flavour (2020); Jerusalem (2012); NOPI (2015); the dessert cookery book Sweet (2017); Ottolenghi Simple (2018); and most recently a series of Ottolenghi Test Kitchen (OTK) books: OTK: Shelf Love (2021) and OTK: Extra Good Things (2022). Ottolenghi's bestselling cookery books have proven influential, with The New York Times noting that they are "widely knocked-off for their plain-spoken instructions, puffy covers, and photographs [that Ottolenghi] oversees himself, eschewing a food stylist". In 2014, the London Evening Standard remarked that Ottolenghi had "radically rewritten the way Londoners cook and eat", and Bon Appétit wrote that he had "made the world love vegetables".

Ottolenghi has hosted three television specials: Jerusalem on a Plate (BBC4, 2011); Ottolenghi's Mediterranean Feast (More4, 2012); and Ottolenghi's Mediterranean Island Feast (More4, 2013). He served as a guest judge on the ninth (2017), eleventh (2019) and thirteenth (2021) seasons of the cooking game show Masterchef Australia. He had declined numerous guest-judge offers in the past and agreed to appear on Masterchef Australia "because it's quite humane and positive....It's about the personal development of the contestants more than the competition."

Published works
 Ottolenghi: The Cookbook (2008) (with Sami Tamimi)
 Plenty (2010)
 Jerusalem: A Cookbook (2012) (with Sami Tamimi)
 Plenty More (2014)
 NOPI (2015) (with Ramael Scully & Tara Wigley)
 Sweet: Desserts from London's Ottolenghi (2017) (with Helen Goh & Tara Wigley)
 Ottolenghi Simple (2018) (with Tara Wigley & Esme Howarth)
 Ottolenghi Flavour (2020) (with Ixta Belfrage & Tara Wigley)
 Ottolenghi Test Kitchen: Shelf Love (2021) (with Noor Murad)
 Ottolenghi Test Kitchen: Extra Good Things (2022) (with Noor Murad)

Awards and recognition
2010 Galaxy National Book Awards "Food and Drink Book of the Year" for Plenty
2010 Observer Food Monthlys "Best Cookbooks Ever", Plenty ranked number 40
2011 Condé Nast Traveler "Innovation and Design Awards", NOPI, winner of the Gourmet award
2011 Observer Food Monthlys "Best Cookbook Award" winner for Plenty
2012 Restaurant and Bar Design Awards, "Identity" category for the restaurant Nopi
2012 Guild of Food Writers Awards, "Kate Whiteman Award for Work on Food and Travel" for Jerusalem on a Plate (BBC4)
2013 James Beard Award "International Cookbook" for Jerusalem
2013 Guild of Food Writers Awards, "Cookery Book Award" for Jerusalem
2013 Guild of Food Writers Awards, "Evelyn Rose Award for Cookery Journalist" for journalism in The Guardian
2013 Gourmand World Cookbook Awards, the Dun Gifford Award winner for Jerusalem
2013 International Association of Culinary Professionals Awards, winner of the International award and the Best Cookbook award for Jerusalem
2013 Fortnum and Mason Food and Drink Awards, "Television Programme of the Year" for Ottolenghi's Mediterranean Feast (Keo Films)
2013 German Gastronomic Academy Silver Medal for Jerusalem 
2013 Observer Food Monthly "Best Cookbook Award" for Jerusalem
2014 Specsavers National Book Awards "Food and Drink Book of the Year" for Plenty More
 2015 Honorary Doctor of Humane Letters from Brandeis University
 2016 James Beard Award "Cooking from a Professional Point of View" for NOPI, the Cookbook

References

External links
 Official website
 

1968 births
Living people
20th-century Israeli Jews
21st-century Israeli Jews
Alumni of Le Cordon Bleu
Gay Jews
Israeli LGBT businesspeople
Cookbook writers
Israeli gay writers
Israeli chefs
Israeli emigrants to the United Kingdom
People from Jerusalem
Businesspeople from London
British Jewish writers
Jewish Israeli writers
Israeli people of German-Jewish descent
Israeli people of Italian-Jewish descent
James Beard Foundation Award winners
Adi Lautman Interdisciplinary Program for Outstanding Students alumni
International Association of Culinary Professionals award winners
LGBT chefs